There are 15 districts of Delhi Police, the agency responsible for maintaining law & order in the National Capital Territory of Delhi. A Police district in Delhi is headed by an IPS officer of the rank of Deputy Commissioner of Police/ DCP (equivalent to  Senior Superintendent of Police/ SSP). As of January 2019, Delhi Police has 178 'territorial' police stations. 

Apart from these, there are 8 Metro Rail, 5 Railways, 2 Airport and 5 Police stations for the specialized crime units namely Crime Branch, Economic Offenses Wing (EOW), Special Cell, Special Police Unit for Women and Children (SPUWAC) and Vigilance.

The new headquarters of Delhi Police is situated at Jai Singh Marg, Connaught Place, New Delhi. The Districts of Delhi Police are different from the 11 administrative or revenue Districts of Delhi, which are headed by an IAS officer of the rank of  Deputy Commissioner (DC).

Organization 

The NCT of Delhi is divided into six Police Ranges, each headed by a  Joint Commissioner of Police (equivalent to Inspector-General of Police). The DCPs of all 15 Police Districts reports to these 6 Joint CPs, who further reports to the Commissioner of Delhi Police. The six ranges of Delhi Police are Central, Eastern, New Delhi, Northern, South-Eastern and South-Western range.

At the police district level, a Deputy Commissioner of Police (DCP) is assisted by Additional DCP and ACP. Below ACP, there are station house officers (SHO) who are in-charge of a police station in India.

List of districts of Delhi Police 
List of 15 Districts of Delhi Police with effect from January 2019. (P.S. stands for Police Station).

Note: A police district is headed by an IPS officer of the rank of Deputy Commissioner of Police (DCP), while a police sub-division is headed by a Sub-divisional police officer (SDPO) of the rank of Assistant Commissioner of Police (ACP).

See also
 List of districts of Delhi
 Neighbourhoods of Delhi

References

Delhi Police
Delhi-related lists
Geography of Delhi